Shanghai Century Publishing(Group) Co., Ltd is a publishing company based in Shanghai, China.

History
It was created on February 24, 1999.

Shanghai People's Publishing House
It is the parent company of Shanghai People's Publishing House, Shanghai Educational Publishing House, Shanghai Translation Publishing House, Truth & Wisdom Press, etc.

References

External links
Shanghai Century Publishing(Group) Co., Ltd

Book publishing companies of China
Mass media in Shanghai